Myint Kyi is a Burmese politician who currently serves as Minister of Municipal  for Sagaing Region and MP  for Pale Township No..2.

Political career 
In the 2015 Myanmar general election, he was elected as a Sagaing Region Hluttaw MP, from Pale Township No.2  parliamentary constituency. He also serving as a Regional Minister of Municipal  for Sagaing Region .

References

National League for Democracy politicians
Living people
People from Sagaing Region
Year of birth missing (living people)